Amelia Tokagahahau Aliki (1845 - 10 March 1895) was a queen of Uvea, ruling from 1869 until 1895.  She was preceded by her aunt Falakika Seilala, and succeeded by her son Vito Lavelua II and Isaake.  

During her reign, the pacific islands was under severe pressure from the colonial powers, which she was forced to address. In 1887, she signed a treaty making the kingdom a French protectorate in exchange for inner self governance and preservation of the monarchy. She converted to Catholicism and had the royal palace and the cathedral erected in the capital.

References

Further reading
 Jean-Dominique Pinelli-Gérard Gourmel, Au Pays de Trois Royaumes, ed. Pacifique, Paris 1991.
 Alexandre Poncet, Histoire de l'île Wallis, Société des Océanistes, Paris 1972.
 Rossella Righetti, Oceano Pacifico, Edizioni & Comunicazione, Milano 2005.

Wallis and Futuna monarchs
19th-century monarchs in Oceania
19th-century women rulers
Queens regnant in Oceania
Roman Catholic monarchs
1845 births
1895 deaths